Story Supernova Music Talents was one of Croatia's versions of the TV reality show American Idol.

The program aired in 2003 on Nova TV. It was co-produced with Story, a Croatian tabloid, hence the name.

The show has introduced 20 performers who later released music records, including:
Aleksandra Kežić
Maja Zeko
Roman Oršuš
Cristiana-Iovanca Uichita
Mirela Bunoza
Mladen Akrap
Jana Tkalec
Jelena Bosančić
Nikolina Božić
Sanja Parmać
Stjepan Marković
Emina Arapović
Valentina Gyerek
Ivana Radovniković
Damir Kedžo
Tin Samardžić
Nera Stipičević
Natali Dizdar
Saša Lozar
Rafael Dropulić

The jury was composed of several known figures in Croatian music, including:
Đorđe Novković
Miroslav Škoro
Vinko Štefanac

The show was succeeded by Hrvatski Idol.

References

Croatian reality television series
Nova TV (Croatia) original programming